Pancole is a village in Tuscany, central Italy, administratively a frazione of the comune of San Gimignano, province of Siena. At the time of the 2001 census its population was 105.

Pancole is about 50 km from Siena and 6 km from San Gimignano.

Mains sights 
Sanctuary of Maria Santissima Madre della Divina Provvidenza
Santa Maria Assunta in Cellole
Castle of Collemucioli

References 

Frazioni of San Gimignano